The 2008 Ironman 70.3 World Championship was a triathlon competition held in Clearwater, Florida on November 8, 2008. The race was sponsored by Foster Grant and organized by the World Triathlon Corporation. The championship race is the culmination of the Ironman 70.3 series of events that took place from October 2007 to September 2008. Athletes, both professional and amateur, earn a spot in the championship race by qualifying in races throughout the 70.3 series. The 2008 championship race was represented by athletes from 52 different countries and 46 different U.S. States.

Medallists

Men

Women

Qualification
The 2008 Ironman 70.3 Series featured 29 events that enabled qualification to the 2008 World Championship event to its top age group finishers, with all races also awarding professional slots. Some 70.3 events also acted as qualifiers for the full Ironman World Championships in Hawaii. The 70.3 Series expanded the number of qualifying races from 23 in 2007 to 29 events in 2008. Those events added included races at Geelong, Australia, Penha, Brazil (replacing the race in Brasilia), Huntsville, Ontario, Pucón, Chile, Haikou, China, Buffalo City, South Africa, Boise, Idaho, Lawrence, Kansas, and Providence, Rhode Island. Events in Port Macquarie and Ensenada, Baja California were discontinued from the series.

Qualifying Ironman 70.3s

2008 Ironman 70.3 Series results

Men

Women

References

External links
Ironman World Championship 70.3 Series

Ironman World Championship
Ironman
Triathlon competitions in the United States
2008 in American sports
Sports competitions in Florida
2008 in sports in Florida
Sports in Clearwater, Florida